Ealing Broadway is a major single-level interchange station in Ealing in London, England. It is in the London Borough of Ealing, West London, and is served by the London Underground and also National Rail on the Great Western Main Line. On the Underground, it is one of three western termini of the District line, the next station being , and it is also one of two western termini of the Central line, the next station being .

The station is managed by Transport for London and is served by London Underground, Great Western Railway, and Elizabeth line services. The station saw a major upgrade and expansion as part of the Crossrail project, with a rebuilt ticket hall and the provision of step free access.

History
As the only station in the area when it opened, it was initially named 'Ealing', but was renamed Ealing Broadway in 1875.

The DR built its own three-platform station (including a siding) to the north of the GWR one. However, following the installation of a connection between the two railways to the east of the stations, DR trains also served the GWR station from 1 March 1883 to 30 September 1885, on a short-lived service running to  station, which quickly became unprofitable. It was also intended to use the connection for a service to  station (via ), but this was never introduced.

The original brick-built DR station was replaced with a stone-faced building in 1910.

Prior to World War I, plans were made by the GWR to construct a new, mainly freight, line between Ealing and Shepherd's Bush, to connect west-to-south with the West London Railway. The Central London Railway (CLR, now the Central Line) would use the line by extending its tracks the short distance north from its terminus at Wood Lane (now closed), to meet the new GWR tracks.

Originally separate companies, by 1920 the DR and the CLR were both owned by the Underground Electric Railways Company of London (UERL). Despite this, the CLR services operated via the GWR station building, not the Underground one.

The GWR-built station was demolished in 1961 and replaced by a low concrete structure containing shops and a ticket hall, opened in 1965, with a high-rise office building above. The new station building serves all the lines, and the separate District Line station ticket hall was closed, although the building remains, and the original station facade is now the entrance for multiple shops.

In the mid 1990s, the Great Western Main Line through the station was electrified as part of the Heathrow Express project.

In the early 1990s, the Crossrail project was proposed to serve Ealing Broadway. After many years of planning, the project was approved in 2007. An interim TfL Rail service between suburban stations and London Paddington began in 2018, transferring to the Elizabeth line on 24 May 2022.

Accidents and incidents
On 16 November 1937, a steam railcar overran signals and crashed into the signal box.
On 19 December 1973, an express passenger train was derailed when an unsecured inspection door on the locomotive hauling it struck point rodding, causing a set of points to move under the train. Ten people were killed, 94 were injured. 
On 19 July 2000, a Real IRA bomb was planted near tracks in the station. It was discovered and destroyed by police under a controlled explosion.
On 2 March 2016, a District Line train derailed just outside the station due to a set of points set incorrectly. There were no injuries.

Modern station

Layout
The combined station has nine platforms:
 Two National Rail platforms (1 and 2). These are only used by Great Western Railway (GWR) trains between Didcot Parkway and London Paddington, except during engineering works or a disruption.
 Two Elizabeth line platforms (3 and 4). Platforms 1, 2, 3 and 4 all are mostly in the open, but have small canopies and shelters. These platforms can be used by GWR too.
 Two Central line (5 and 6), which have a shared awning canopy.
 Three District Line (7 to 9). District Line platforms 8 and 9 are partially covered by a short canopy, and retain one original example and a number of replicas of early solid-disc Underground signs, used before Edward Johnston designed the familiar roundel in 1919.

All platforms are accessed through a gateline of ticket barriers.

Crossrail upgrades 
As part of the Crossrail project, the station has been upgraded and expanded to meet increased passenger numbers, improve the interchange between various rail and local bus services and provide step free access.

Initially, only minor station improvements were planned as part of the Crossrail project, such as platform lengthening. However, after local and regional campaigning, the station will be upgraded and step free access provided. After further criticism by local people of poor design, the station entrance was redesigned with a large glass frontage and a long curved canopy to the street.

Designed by Bennetts Associates, the station upgrade has involved demolishing the old cramped ticket hall and staircases, replacing them with:

 A new double height ticket hall, twice as large as the previous ticket hall.
 Improved and enlarged public realm outside the station with new paving, seating and street trees.
 Step free access from street to platform via new lifts, making the station fully accessible.
 Refurbishment and upgrade of existing platforms, including new signage, waiting rooms and customer information screens.
 Platform extensions to accommodate the longer Class 345 trains used by Crossrail.
 New footbridge at the eastern end of the station linking platforms 1–4.

After several periods of delay, construction on the upgrade began in 2018 by Network Rail. On 27 May 2021, the majority of the new station facilities, including the station building and ticket office, were completed and opened to the public.

Proposed developments
In the early 2010s, the West London Business group backed a Surbiton-to-Brent Cross light metro tube line, called the West London Orbital underground railway, based on Copenhagen Metro technology, which would include a station underground at Ealing Broadway. The London Borough of Ealing does not support the proposal, saying "no consensus to progress this project [due] to extremely high costs".

In 2008, the London Group of the Campaign for Better Transport published a plan for an off-road orbital North and West London Light railway (NWLLR), sharing the Dudding Hill Line freight corridor, and using the middle two of the six track beds at North Acton. In April 2009 Ealing Council voted to call on Transport for London to look into the proposal.

The station would have been served by the West London Tram, however this proposal was cancelled in 2007 as it was opposed by the councils of all three London Boroughs that would have been served by the line.

Services

Ealing Broadway is served by a mixture of National Rail and London Underground services. National Rail services are operated by the Elizabeth line and Great Western Railway and London Underground services are provided by the District and Central lines.

Services at the station are as follows.

Great Western Railway
The typical off-peak service in trains per hour is:
 2 tph to 

Great Western Railway services are operated using  EMUs.

Elizabeth line
The typical off-peak service in trains per hour is:
 8 tph to 
 2 tph to 
 2 tph to 

Elizabeth line services are operated using  EMUs.

London Underground

The typical off-peak service in trains per hour is:
 9 tph to Newbury Park of which 6 continue to Hainault (Central line)
 6 tph to  via Earl's Court (District line)

The Central line also operates a night service on Friday and Saturday nights as part of the Night Tube. The station is served by a train every 20 minutes to and from Loughton.

Connections
London Buses routes 65, 112, 207, 226, 297, 483, 607, E1, E2, E7, E8, E9, E10, E11, and night routes N7, N11, N65, N83 and N207 serve the station.

References

External links

 London Transport Museum Photographic Archive
 
 
 
 
 
 
 www.londonstation.com - Platforms 8 and 9 with early roundel signs visible

Central line (London Underground) stations
District line stations
London Underground Night Tube stations
Railway stations in the London Borough of Ealing
Tube stations in the London Borough of Ealing
Former Great Western Railway stations
Railway stations in Great Britain opened in 1838
Former Metropolitan District Railway stations
Railway stations in Great Britain opened in 1879
Great Western Main Line
Railway stations served by Great Western Railway
Railway stations served by the Elizabeth line
1838 establishments in England